Alfredo Elías Ayub (born 13 January 1950) is the former Director General of the Comisión Federal de Electricidad (CFE), which is the Mexican electric state-owned company.

Elías Ayub is of Lebanese descent   was born in Mexico City. Elías Ayub earned a civil engineer's degree from Universidad Anáhuac. He was a member of the first class graduating from the School of Engineering at that university. He graduated with high honors. He also holds an MBA degree from Harvard University's Business School (HBS). He received an Honorary Mention upon graduation from HBS.

His academic activities include holding the position of Deputy Director (1978-1979) and Director (1979) of Universidad Anáhuac's Engineering School, professor of Finance at Harvard University, as well as a Board Member of Harvard University's Business School.

Career
Elías has had an outstanding career in Mexico's public sector. 
 He worked as Director of Coordination and Programming of the Mexican Fund for Social Activities (Fonapas) from 1977 to 1979.
 He was Deputy Director General in 1980 and held the position of Director General between 1981 and 1983. 
 He became the Executive Coordinator at the State of Mexico government's Urban Development and Public Works Secretariat ("Secretaría de Desarrollo Urbano y Obras Públicas" in Spanish) (1983-1985).
 He then served as Private Secretary of the Secretary of Energy, Mines and State-Owned Industry (SEMIP), Alfredo del Mazo (1986).
 Coordinator of Advisors at SEMIP (1986-1988)
 Deputy Minister of Mines and Basic Industry (1988-1993) and then deputy Energy Minister (1993 - 1995) of SEMIP. 
 During his tenure at the Energy Ministry, he served with several secretaries in three different administrations, during the presidencies of Miguel de la Madrid, Carlos Salinas de Gortari, and Ernesto Zedillo Ponce de León.
 He was then Director General of the Aeropuertos y Servicios Auxiliares (Mexican Airport Authority) (ASA) (1996-1999) during Zedillo's administration.
 Finally he held the position of Director General of Comisión Federal de Electricidad from January 1999 until March 2011. He was appointed to this position by president Ernesto Zedillo, and then ratified by president Vicente Fox. He was one of only two members of the PRI political party initially ratified to be part of Fox's administration. In March 2011, Elías Ayub was replaced as Director General by Antonio Vivanco Casamadrid. Elías Ayub "left the post after 12 years for health reasons."

The Federal Electricity Commission reports to the Ministry of Energy. Thus, Elías Ayub reported to Felipe Calderón Hinojosa when he was Secretary. Then, president Calderón also ratified Elías Ayub to continue his long tenure as head of the CFE.

In the private sector, he is shareholder and/or member of the boards of several companies such as Grupo Impulsor del Desarrollo Urbano (IDUSA), Constructora Ideurban, Promociones Metropólis, and other private enterprises.

Boards
He belongs to several boards of directors.
 Banorte, Mexico's third largest bank
 Rotoplas
 Former Member of Dean's board of advisers at Harvard Business School

References

https://www.bmv.com.mx/es/Grupo_BMV/PerfilEmpresa/AGUA-31600
https://www.bmv.com.mx/es/emisoras/perfil/GFNORTE-5433

External links
 CFE's Website

1950 births
Living people
Businesspeople from Mexico City
Mexican people of Lebanese descent
Harvard Business School alumni
Harvard Business School faculty
Academic staff of Universidad Anáhuac México